Černouček is a municipality and village in Litoměřice District in the Ústí nad Labem Region of the Czech Republic. It has about 300 inhabitants.

Geography
It lies in the Lower Eger Table, in the Polabí lowlands.

History
The first written mention of Černouček is from 1100, when the village was donated to the Vyšehrad Chapter. From the 16th century until the establishment of a sovereign municipality, Černouček was part of the Roudnice estate and shared its owners.

Sights
The main landmark of Černouček is the Church of Saint Bartholomew. It was originally a Romanesque church. In 1769–1774, it was replaced by a new Baroque building.

Notable people
Josef Věromír Pleva (1899–1985), writer; taught in local school in 1929–1930
Petr Pavel (born 1961), army general and president of the Czech Republic; lives here
Eva Pavlová (born 1964), first lady of the Czech Republic, municipal assembly of Černouček; lives here

Gallery

References

External links

Villages in Litoměřice District